Achucallani  or Achuqallani (Aymara achuqalla weasel, -ni a suffix to indicate ownership, "the one with a weasel (or weasels)", Hispanicized spelling Achoccallane) is a mountain in the Andes of Peru, about  high. It is located in the Puno Region, Melgar Province, Ayaviri District.

References

Mountains of Peru
Mountains of Puno Region